Saint Sergius (died 304) was a Cappadocian monk who was martyred in the persecutions of Diocletian. His feast day is 24 February.

Some saints lists say his relics were brought to the Spanish town of Úbeda; it is a mistake: Primus Cabilonensis, in his Topographia (ca. 1450) states that Sergius' relics were moved to Baetulo (now Badalona, near Barcelona), but there is no evidence for this. The Latin name of the town has been confused with the Latin Betulla, now Úbeda (Andalusia), and different sources (mostly modern), state that relics are in the Andalusian town. Actually, there are no relics in Úbeda nor in Badalona.

External links
Sergius at Patron Saints Index
24 February saints at SaintPatrickDC.org

304 deaths
Saints from Roman Anatolia
4th-century Christian saints
Year of birth unknown